Javier Jesus Ortiz (born November 28, 1979) is a Colombian professional baseball pitcher.He played for the Colombian Mayor League. He played in the minor league organizations of the New York Yankees and Chicago White Sox from 1997 to 2005. After that he played in independent ball in the Northern League and Golden Baseball League and in foreign leagues in Italy and Mexico. Currently married and living with the Cuban Quenia. His son Yalier and his stepdaughters Nathalia and Aynek

Ortiz was selected to the roster for the Colombia national baseball team at the 2006 Central American and Caribbean Games, 2010 South American Games, 2010 Pan American Games Qualifying Tournament, 2015 Pan American Games and 2017 World Baseball Classic.

References

External links

1979 births
Living people
Baseball players at the 2015 Pan American Games
Birmingham Barons players
Calgary Vipers players
Charlotte Knights players
Chico Outlaws players
Colombian baseball players
Colombian expatriate baseball players in Canada
Colombian expatriate baseball players in Mexico
Colombian expatriate baseball players in the United States
Colombian expatriate sportspeople in Italy
Colombian expatriate sportspeople in Mexico
Columbus Clippers players
Dominican Summer League Yankees players
Colombian expatriate baseball players in the Dominican Republic
Expatriate baseball players in Italy
Greensboro Bats players
Gulf Coast Yankees players
Mexican League baseball pitchers
Navegantes del Magallanes players
Colombian expatriate baseball players in Venezuela
Parma Baseball Club players
Sportspeople from Cartagena, Colombia
Rieleros de Aguascalientes players
Staten Island Yankees players
Tampa Yankees players
Trenton Thunder players
Winston-Salem Warthogs players
Yuma Scorpions players
2017 World Baseball Classic players
Pan American Games competitors for Colombia